Asociación Deportiva Atenas, known simply as Atenas or Atenas de Córdoba, is a sports club based in Córdoba, Argentina. It was founded in 1938, and is mostly known for its achievements in basketball. The club is the winningest team of Argentina holding 20 titles. Club's home arena is Polideportivo Carlos Cerutti, while some high attendance games are held at the Orfeo Superdomo.

Apart from basketball, other sports practised at Atenas are rhythmic gymnastics and volleyball.

History

The club was founded on March 7, 1938, mainly by former members of the New Tennis Club.

Before the creation of the Liga Nacional de Básquet (first Argentine nationwide professional league), Atenas was successful at the Cordobese basketball league, winning the championship consecutively between 1948 and 1957 (exception made of 1953).

Since the creation of the Liga Nacional in 1984, Atenas has become the most successful team in the league, winning the championship 9 times: 1987, 1988, 1990, 1991–92, 1997–98, 1998–99, 2001–02, 2002–03 and 2008–09. Moreover, the Córdoba outfit has won the Liga Sudamericana (South American League) in 1997, 1998 and 2004, and the former Campeonato Sudamericano de Clubes (South American Clubs Championship) in 1993, 1994, and 1996.

Many Argentine internationals have played in Atenas, namely Fabricio Oberto, Walter Herrmann, Marcelo Milanesio, Héctor Campana, Patricio Prato, Gabriel Mikulas, Diego Lo Grippo, Fernando Prato, Bruno Lábaque, Leonardo Gutiérrez, Juan Manuel Locatelli, Diego Osella, Carlos Cerutti and Juan Espil, among others.

Players

Current roster

Retired numbers
Atenas has retired a total of four numbers, being Marcelo Milanesio's n° 9 the first number to be retired in the history of LNB, when the club put it out of circulation in 2002.

Titles

National
 Liga Nacional (9): 1987, 1988, 1990, 1991–92, 1997–98, 1998–99, 2001–02, 2002–03, 2008–09
 Copa de Campeones (2): 1998, 1999
 Super 8 (1): 2010–11
 Top 4 (1): 2003–04
 Copa Argentina (1): 2008

International
 Liga Sudamericana (3): 1997, 1998, 2004
 Campeonato Sudamericano (2): 1993, 1994
 Campeonato Panamericano (1): 1996

Records and facts
 Largest win: 140–81 to Independiente de Tucumán (1985-08-29)
 Worst defeat: 49–83 to Gimnasia y Esgrima LP (2004-01-06)
 The Argentine team with most national (14) and international (6) titles
 All-time topscorer: Marcelo Milanesio (10,835)
 Most games played: Marcelo Milanesio (848)

References

External links

 

Basketball teams in Argentina
Basketball teams established in 1938
Argentine volleyball teams